The PSLV-C44 was the 46th mission of the Indian Polar Satellite Launch Vehicle (PSLV) program. It was the first flight of PSLV-DL, having 2 strap-on boosters and placed a primary payload Microsat-R and a secondary payload of Kalamsat V2 in Sun-synchronous orbits.

PSLV-C44 launch 
The PSLV-C44 was launched from the First Launch Pad (FLP) of the Satish Dhawan Space Centre in Sriharikota at 11:37:00 P.M. IST on 24 January 2019, following a 28-hour countdown that began at 07:37 P.M. IST on 23 January 2019.

Mission overview 
 Mass:
 Payload weight: 

 Overall height: 

 Propellant:
 Stage 1: Composite Solid 
 Stage 2: Earth Storable Liquid 
 Stage 3: Composite Solid 
 Stage 4: Earth Storable Liquid

 Propellant mass:
 Stage 1: 
 Stage 2: 
 Stage 3: 
 Stage 4: 

 Altitude: 
 Maximum velocity:  (recorded at time of Kalamsat separation)
 Inclination: 96.567°
 Azimuth: 140° 
 Period: 

The PSLV C-44 rocket had four stages; each one was self-contained, with its own propulsion system, thereby capable of functioning independently. The first and third stages used composite solid propellants, while the second and fourth stage used earth-storable liquid propellants.

The satellite Microsat-R was placed into a lower Sun-synchronous orbit of  altitude and 96.575° inclination, meanwhile, the second satellite was placed with an experimental 4th stage into an orbit of  altitude and 98.767°. The satellite was launched free of cost and was placed into the orbit after 2 subsequent rocket burn past Microsat-R release.

References

External links 

 PSLV-C44 / Microsat-R Mission - 

Polar Satellite Launch Vehicle
Spacecraft launched by India in 2019
January 2019 events in India
Rocket launches in 2019